Clara Petrozzi (former Clara Petrozzi-Stubin, born Clara Cristina Petrozzi Helasvuo; 30 December 1965) is a Peruvian-born violinist, violist, musicologist and composer. She is based in Finland.

Biography
Clara was born in Lima, Peru in 1965. His father is of Italian descent. Her mother is the Finnish cellist Annika Helasvuo, and her uncle is Finnish flutist Mikael Helasvuo. In 1972 she began studying violin in Lima and Quito, Ecuador with Dee Martz, Manuel Díaz, Mario Ortiz, Egon Fellig and Yolanda Kronberger. In Lima she was a member of several chamber ensembles and young people orchestras. She has performed as viola soloist with the Peruvian National Symphony, the National Conservatory Symphony and the "Camerata de Lima" orchestras.

She studied Suzuki pedagogy with Marilyn O'Boyle and has worked as a violin teacher since 1983. She received a degree in music education employing the Suzuki method, from the European Suzuki Association (2005). She studied viola in Finland with Jouko Mansnerus between 1990 and 1996, and Music Theory at the Espoo Music Institute.

Clara Petrozzi studied Musicology at the University of Helsinki; she also studied Composition and Orchestration with Harri Vuori between 1999 and 2001, premiering her compositions in Finland and Peru. At present she is a violin teacher at the Orbinski Music School in Espoo and at the Käpylä Music School.

Her Master Thesis is an analysis of "Homenaje a Stravinsky (Homage to Stravinsky)", by Peruvian composer Édgar Valcárcel, and its relations with popular music. She defended her PhD thesis in 2009, being its subject on Peruvian orchestral music between 1945 and 2005. To complement this work she has created a catalogue that can be accessed online. At present she is researching on Latin-American music presence in Finland.

Petrozzi has presented papers and lectures at seminars organized by the Ibero-American Centre of the University of Helsinki, where she has offered lectures on Peruvian orchestral music (2003, 2004); at the New Winds in Musicology seminars at the University of Helsinki (2004, 2005, 2006, 2008); at the Finnish National Congress on Musicology at Tampere University (2008); and at the Congress "Multiculturalism and Arts" at the University of Turku (2008). In 2009 she presented a paper on the subject in the 28th International Congress of the Latin-American Studies Association. In 2006 she was awarded a prize in Musicology by the National Conservatory of Peru. She has also made presentations for the SysMus09 Conference of 2009 in Gent, Belgium, and the Beyond the Centres Conference of 2010 in Thessaloniki, Greece.

Petrozzi is member of the Círculo de Composición del Perú.

Articles
 "Nacionalismo, modernismo y uso del folklore en el Homenaje a Stravinsky de Edgar Valcárcel". Conservatorio (Lima) nro. 9-10, diciembre 2002. 10-32.
 "Modernismo e influencia de la música popular: Tres obras orquestales de Celso Garrido-Lecca". Conservatorio (Lima) nro. 14, diciembre 2006. 22-33.
 "Peruvian orchestral music 1945-2005. Identities in diversity". 2nd Conference on Systematic Musicology SysMus09 Proceedings. Gent 2009.
 "Identidades en la música peruana del cambio del milenio. El caso de Circomper". Cuadernos de música, artes visuales y artes escénicas (Bogotá), V.5 No.2, 2010. 43-60.

Compositions
 Clarinet and Piano Duo, 1999 first performance University of Helsinki
 Quartet for two Flutes and Percussion, 2000 f.p. University of Helsinki
 Niin pienestä kiinni (Cutting it Fine) for Strings, 2001 f.p. Mikkeli City Orchestra
 Tikka tanssi (Woodpecker Dance) for Children choir, text: Kanteletar, 2001 f.p. Sympaatti
 Jouluna Jumala syntyi (God was born in Christmas) for Children choir and ensemble, 2002, commission from Rudolf Steiner School, Helsinki, published in the CD Lehtikuusi soi
 Viola and Piano Duo, 2008, fp Aino Ackté-villa, Helsinki
 Interno for solo violoncello, 2009, fp Lima Cello Biennal 2009
 Näyt (Visions), flute, viola, cello and double bass, 2012 fp 2012 Aurinko, at Stoa Helsinki
 Secreto (The secret), chamber opera, libretto by Maritza Núñez, 2012, fp Lima
 String quintet, 2013, fp Aurinko, at Metropolia hall, Helsinki
 El árbol (The tree), voice and guitar, text by Alfredo Queirolo 2015, fp Metropolia
 Variaciones sobre un tema de Jordy (Variations on a theme by Jordy) solo viola, 2018, fp Clara Petrozzi, Kulttuuritalo Laikku, Tampere, Finland, 17.9.2020
 La amistad (Friendship) for children's choir, 2020
 Collaboration at the virtual opera Eclipses libretto by Maritza Núñez, 2020, fp on internet 2020

References

External links 
 978-952-10-5690-1 Clara Petrozzi-Stubin's PhD thesis (in Spanish)
 Peruvian orchestral music catalogue (in Spanish)
 Proceedings of SysMus09
 Article "Identidades en la música peruana del cambio de milenio. El caso de Circomper"
 Sulasol Music Press

Finnish classical violinists
Finnish classical violists
Finnish musicologists
Women musicologists
Finnish composers
Peruvian composers
Living people
1965 births
People from Lima
Peruvian people of Italian descent
University of Helsinki alumni
Finnish people of Italian descent
20th-century Finnish musicians
21st-century Finnish musicians
20th-century women musicians
21st-century women musicians
21st-century classical violinists
Peruvian people of Finnish descent
Women classical violinists
20th-century violists
21st-century violists